Bjørn Vilhelm Ravn Rasmussen (19 May 1885 – 9 August 1962) was a Danish amateur football (soccer) player in the striker position, who won a silver medal with the Danish national team in the 1908 Summer Olympics football tournament. Rasmussen played two games for the Danish national team. He played his club football with Kjøbenhavns Boldklub.

References

External links
Danish national team profile
DatabaseOlympics profile

1885 births
1962 deaths
Danish men's footballers
Kjøbenhavns Boldklub players
Footballers at the 1908 Summer Olympics
Olympic footballers of Denmark
Olympic silver medalists for Denmark
Denmark international footballers
Olympic medalists in football
Medalists at the 1908 Summer Olympics
Association football forwards